{{Infobox election
| election_name      = 1980 New Zealand Labour Party leadership election
| flag_image         = Labour L Logo.png
| type               = legislative
| ongoing            = no
| previous_election  = 1974 New Zealand Labour Party leadership election
| previous_year      = 1974
| next_election      = 1983 New Zealand Labour Party leadership election
| next_year          = 1983
| election_date      = 12 December 1980
| 1blank             = Caucus
| image1             = 
| candidate1         = Bill Rowling
| colour1            = DC241F
| leaders_seat1      = 
| popular_vote1      = 19
| percentage1        = 51.40%
| 1data1             = 
| image2             = 
| candidate2         = David Lange
| colour2            = DC241F
| leaders_seat2      = 
| popular_vote2      = 18
| percentage2        = 49.60%
| 1data2             = 
| title              = Leader
| before_election    = Bill Rowling
| posttitle          = Leader after election
| after_election     = Bill Rowling
}}
The 1980 New Zealand Labour Party leadership election''' was held on 12 December 1980 to determine the leadership of the New Zealand Labour Party. The leadership was retained by former Prime Minister Bill Rowling, who had led the party for the last six years.

Background 
Rowling was already seriously considering resigning from politics altogether. Earlier in 1980 Rowling sacked Roger Douglas from his shadow cabinet as consumer affairs and transport spokesperson for releasing an unauthorised alternative budget, fuelling prospects of a leadership challenge from Douglas' friend David Lange. Many were also weary of the fact that Labour was still polling well below National and just barely ahead of the Social Credit Party, who reached their popularity zenith during the East Coast Bays by-election.

Candidates

Bill Rowling  
However, he was able to claim a moral victory in the latter where Labour polled more votes overall than National, although they won fewer seats. His contemporaries argued that Labour’s losses reflected badly on Rowling himself, despite making a substantial effort in rebuilding the party's membership during its time in opposition. Also, the fact that Rowling lacked the backing of the trade unions was crippling in Labour's circles and hampered his leverage in party structure.

David Lange 
After entering parliament in a by-election that received much media attention and helped propel him to the deputy leadership of the Labour Party in 1979, Lange became Labour's rising star. Lange was Shadow Minister for Social Welfare from 1978 to 1979 and since 1979 had been Deputy Leader of the Opposition, Shadow Attorney-General, Shadow Minister of Justice and Shadow Minister of Pacific Island Affairs. Lange had always been a critic of Rowling and came "to resent the bloody-mindedness with which he clung to the leadership."

Result
A caucus vote was held on 12 December 1980 where half the attendees supported a leadership change, and the other half opposed. After a silent pause, Rowling added that he too opposed, bringing the total votes for himself to 19 and enabling him to cling on to the party's leadership by a single vote.

Leadership ballot

How each MP voted
A list of each MP's vote.

Three MPs were not present. Both Frank O'Flynn and Joe Walding were overseas and Bill Fraser was absent due to illness. Given the closeness of the result, their presence could have changed the result. Walding was a Rowling supporter whilst O'Flynn was likely to back Lange. Fraser was also thought to have favoured a leadership change.

Aftermath 
Rowling remained leader until 1983. He was visibly wounded by the challenge and called Lange's supporters 'nakedly ambitious rats', which he refused to retract. Later, Lange and a group of his core supporters (Roger Douglas, Michael Bassett, Richard Prebble and Mike Moore) became known as the "Fish and Chip Brigade" due to a picture published at the time with the group (minus Prebble) eating Fish and chips in Douglas' office after the vote.

Lange noted the lack of any ideological motives about the election to be odd, stating "It was a mixture of loyalty, distrust, calculation, idealism and opportunism which decided the vote". Following the coup attempt Lange resigned as deputy leader in January 1981 to offer himself for re-election as a vote of confidence. At Labour's first caucus meeting of the year he was re-elected as deputy leader.

Notes

References

Labour Party leadership
1980
Indirect elections
December 1980 events in New Zealand
New Zealand Labour Party leadership election